ISO 216 is an international standard for paper sizes, used around the world except in North America and parts of Latin America. The standard defines the "A", "B" and "C" series of paper sizes, including A4, the most commonly available paper size worldwide. Two supplementary standards, ISO 217 and ISO 269, define related paper sizes; the ISO 269 "C" series is commonly listed alongside the A and B sizes.

All ISO 216, ISO 217 and ISO 269 paper sizes (except some envelopes) have the same aspect ratio,  within rounding to millimetres. This ratio has the unique property that when cut or folded in half widthways, the halves also have the same aspect ratio. Each ISO paper size is one half of the area of the next larger size in the same series.

Dimensions of A, B and C series

History 

The formats that became ISO paper sizes A2, A3, B3, B4, and B5 were developed in France. They were listed in a 1798 law on taxation of publications that was based in part on page sizes.

Searching for a standard system of paper formats on a scientific basis by the association Die Brücke, as a replacement for the vast variety of other paper formats that had been used before, in order to make paper stocking and document reproduction cheaper and more efficient, Wilhelm Ostwald proposed in 1911, over a hundred years after the “Loi sur le timbre”, a Weltformat (world format) for paper sizes based on the ratio 1:, referring to the argument advanced by Lichtenberg's 1786 letter, and linking this to the metric system by using 1 centimetre as the width of the base format. W. Porstmann argued in a long article published in 1918, that a firm basis for the system of paper formats, which deal with surfaces, could not be the length, but the surface, i.e. linking the system of paper formats to the metric system of measures by the square metre, using the two formulae of x / y = 1: and x × y = 1. Porstmann also argued that formats for containers of paper like envelopes should be 10% larger than the paper format itself.

In 1921, after a long discussion and another intervention by W. Porstmann, the Normenausschuß der deutschen Industrie (NADI, "Standardisation Committee of German Industry", today Deutsches Institut für Normung or short DIN) published German standard DI Norm 476 the specification of 4 series of paper formats with ratio 1:, with series A as the always preferred formats and basis for the other series. All measures are rounded to the nearest millimetre. A0 has a surface area of 1 square metre up to a rounding error, with a width of 841 mm and height of 1189 mm, so an actual area of 0.999949 m2, and A4 recommended as standard paper size for business, administrative and government correspondence and A6 for postcards. Series B is based on B0 with width of 1 metre, C0 is 917 mm × 1297 mm, and D0 771 mm × 1090 mm. Series C is the basis for envelope formats.

The DIN paper-format concept was soon introduced as a national standard in many other countries, for example, Belgium (1924), Netherlands (1925), Norway (1926), Switzerland (1929), Sweden (1930), Soviet Union (1934), Hungary (1938), Italy (1939), Finland (1942), Uruguay (1942), Argentina (1943), Brazil (1943), Spain (1947), Austria (1948), Romania (1949), Japan (1951), Denmark (1953), Czechoslovakia (1953), Israel (1954), Portugal (1954), Yugoslavia (1956), India (1957), Poland (1957), United Kingdom (1959), Venezuela (1962), New Zealand (1963), Iceland (1964), Mexico (1965), South Africa (1966), France (1967), Peru (1967), Turkey (1967), Chile (1968), Greece (1970), Zimbabwe (1970), Singapore (1970), Bangladesh (1972), Thailand (1973), Barbados (1973), Australia (1974), Ecuador (1974), Colombia (1975) and Kuwait (1975).

It finally became both an international standard (ISO 216) as well as the official United Nations document format in 1975, and it is today used in almost all countries in the world, with the exception of USA, Canada, Mexico, Peru, Colombia, and the Dominican Republic.

In 1977, a large German car manufacturer performed a study of the paper formats found in their incoming mail and concluded that out of 148 examined countries, 88 already used the A series formats.

Advantages

The main advantage of this system is its scaling. Rectangular paper with an aspect ratio of  has the unique property that, when cut or folded in half midway between its longer sides, each half has the same  aspect ratio as the whole sheet before it was divided.

The ISO system of paper sizes exploits these properties of the  aspect ratio. In each series of sizes (for example, series A), the largest size is numbered 0 (for example, A0), and each successive size (for example, A1, A2, etc.) has half the area of the preceding sheet and can be cut by halving the length of the preceding size sheet. The new measurement is rounded down to the nearest millimetre.  A folded brochure can be made by using a sheet of the next larger size (for example, an A4 sheet is folded in half to make a brochure with size A5 pages. An office photocopier or printer can be designed to reduce a page from A4 to A5 or to enlarge a page from A4 to A3. Similarly, two sheets of A4 can be scaled down to fit one A4 sheet without excess empty paper.

This system also simplifies calculating the weight of paper. Under ISO 536, paper's grammage is defined as a sheet's mass in grams (g) per area in square metres (unit symbol g/m2; the nonstandard abbreviation "gsm" is also used). Thus the weight, and the associated postage rate, can be easily approximated by counting the number of sheets used.

ISO 216 and its related standards were first published between 1975 and 1995:
 ISO 216:2007, defining the A and B series of paper sizes
 ISO 269:1985, defining the C series for envelopes
 ISO 217:2013, defining the RA and SRA series of raw ("untrimmed") paper sizes

Properties

A series

A0 is defined so that it has an area of 1 m before rounding to the nearest millimetre. Hence, each next size is nearly exactly half of the prior size. So, an A1 page can fit two A2 pages inside the same area.

For comparison, the letter paper size commonly used in North America is about  wider and  shorter than A4. Then, the size of A5 paper is half of A4, as  ×  ( × ).

The geometric rationale for using the square root of 2 is to maintain the aspect ratio of each subsequent rectangle after cutting or folding an A-series sheet in half, perpendicular to the larger side.

B series
The B series is defined in the standard as follows: "A subsidiary series of sizes is obtained by placing the geometrical means between adjacent sizes of the A series in sequence." The use of the geometric mean makes each step in size: B0, A0, B1, A1, B2 ... smaller than the previous one by the same factor. As with the A series, the lengths of the B series have the ratio , and folding one in half (and rounding down to the nearest millimetre) gives the next in the series. The shorter side of B0 is exactly 1 metre.

There is also an incompatible Japanese B series which the JIS defines to have 1.5 times the area of the corresponding JIS A series (which is identical to the ISO A series). Thus, the lengths of JIS B series paper are  ≈ 1.22 times those of A-series paper. By comparison, the lengths of ISO B series paper are  ≈ 1.19 times those of A-series paper.

C series
The C series formats are geometric means between the B series and A series formats with the same number (e.g. C2 is the geometric mean between B2 and A2). The lengths of ISO C series paper are therefore  ≈ 1.09 times those of A-series paper.

The C series formats are used mainly for envelopes. An unfolded A4 page will fit into a C4 envelope. Due to same width to height ratio, if an A4 page is folded in half so that it is A5 in size, it will fit into a C5 envelope (which will be the same size as a C4 envelope folded in half).

Tolerances
The tolerances specified in the standard are:
 ±1.5 mm for dimensions up to 150 mm,
 ±2.0 mm for dimensions in the range 150 to 600 mm, and
 ±3.0 mm for dimensions above 600 mm.

These are related to comparison between series A, B and C.

Application

The ISO 216 formats are organized around the ratio 1:; two sheets next to each other together have the same ratio, sideways.  In scaled photocopying, for example, two A4 sheets reduced to A5 size fit exactly onto one A4 sheet, and an A4 sheet in magnified size onto an A3 sheet; in each case, there is neither waste nor want.

The principal countries not generally using the ISO paper sizes are the United States and Canada, which use North American paper sizes.  Although they have also officially adopted the ISO 216 paper format, Mexico, Panama, Peru, Colombia, the Philippines, and Chile also use mostly U.S. paper sizes.

Rectangular sheets of paper with the ratio 1: are popular in paper folding, such as origami, where they are sometimes called "A4 rectangles" or "silver rectangles".  In other contexts, the term "silver rectangle" can also refer to a rectangle in the proportion 1:(1 + ), known as the silver ratio.

Matching technical pen widths

An adjunct to the ISO paper sizes, particularly the A series, are the technical drawing line widths specified in ISO 128. For example, line type A ("Continuous - thick", used for "visible outlines") has a standard thickness of 0.7 mm on an A0-sized sheet, 0.5 mm on an A1 sheet, and 0.35 mm on A2, A3, or A4.

The matching technical pen widths are 0.13, 0.18, 0.25, 0.35, 0.5, 0.7, 1.0, 1.40, and 2.0 mm, as specified in ISO 9175-1. Colour codes are assigned to each size to facilitate easy recognition by the drafter.

{| class="wikitable"
|-
!style="text-align:left"| Linewidth (mm)
|width="9%" colspan=2| 0.10
|width="9%" colspan=2| 0.13
|width="9%" colspan=2| 0.18
|width="9%" colspan=2| 0.25
|width="9%" colspan=2| 0.35
|width="9%" colspan=2| 0.50
|width="9%" colspan=2| 0.70
|width="9%" colspan=2| 1.0
|width="9%" colspan=2| 1.4
|width="9%" colspan=2| 2.0
|-
!style="text-align:left"| Colour
|width="2%" style="background:brown"| ||Maroon
|width="2%" style="background:darkmagenta"| ||Violet
|width="2%" style="background:crimson"| ||Red
|width="2%" style="background:white"| ||White
|width="2%" style="background:gold"| ||Yellow
|width="2%" style="background:saddlebrown"| ||Brown
|width="2%" style="background:steelblue"| ||Blue
|width="2%" style="background:chocolate"| ||Orange
|width="2%" style="background:lightseagreen"| ||Green
|width="2%" style="background:silver"| ||Gray
|}

 The earlier DIN 6775 standard upon which ISO 9175-1 is based also specified a term and symbol for easy identification of pens and drawing templates compatible with the standard, called Micronorm, which may still be found on some technical drafting equipment.

See also
 ANSI/ASME Y14.1
 International standard envelope sizes
 Paper density

References

External links

 International standard paper sizes: ISO 216 details and rationale
 ISO 216 at iso.org
 Articles by Wilhelm Ostwald referencing Lichtenberg's letter, and W. Porstmann specifying a metric system of norms for formats for lengths, surfaces (planes), and volumes, laying the ground for the DIN-Series, in German
Explanation of paper sizes

00216
Stationery
Metrication
Technical specifications